The 1946 Norwegian Football Cup was the 41st season of the Norwegian annual knockout football tournament. The tournament was open for all members of NFF, except those from Northern Norway. The final was played at Ullevaal Stadion in Oslo on 13 October 1946, and was contested by the same two teams as in last year's final. The defending champions Lyn won 3-2 after extra time against last year's losing finalist Fredrikstad and secured their sixth title.

First round

|-
|colspan="3" style="background-color:#97DEFF"|Replay

|}

Second round

|-
|colspan="3" style="background-color:#97DEFF"|Replay

|}

Third round

|colspan="3" style="background-color:#97DEFF"|25 August 1946

|-
|colspan="3" style="background-color:#97DEFF"|Replay: 1 September 1946

|}

Fourth round

|colspan="3" style="background-color:#97DEFF"|8 September 1946

|}

Quarter-finals

|colspan="3" style="background-color:#97DEFF"|22 September 1946

|-
|colspan="3" style="background-color:#97DEFF"|Replay: 29 September 1946

|}

Semi-finals

|colspan="3" style="background-color:#97DEFF"|29 September 1946

|-
|colspan="3" style="background-color:#97DEFF"|6 October 1946

|}

Final

See also
1946 in Norwegian football

References

Norwegian Football Cup seasons
Norway
Cup